Muhammad Ahmad (born 3 January 1988) is a Pakistani footballer who plays as a centre back for Khan Research Laboratories and the Pakistan national team.

References

 

1988 births
Living people
Pakistani footballers
Pakistani expatriate footballers
Pakistan international footballers
Expatriate footballers in Bahrain
Pakistani expatriate sportspeople in Bahrain
Association football central defenders
Footballers at the 2010 Asian Games
Footballers at the 2014 Asian Games
Asian Games competitors for Pakistan